Customer value maximization (CVM) is a real-time service model that, proponents say, goes beyond basic customer relationship management (CRM) capabilities, identifying and capturing maximum potential from prospects and existing customers.

Customer-centricity 

The CVM framework evaluates current methods and effectiveness, makes changes where required, and sets up a measurement system that helps in evaluating effectiveness. The CVM framework operates as a continuous process in a closed loop.

The CVM framework is closely related to the idea of customer-lifetime-value.

One of the most efficient and basic strategies to maximize the value that each customer generates is to split customers into defined segments, a process called client segmentation.

Marketing challenges 

Marketing challenges can be predominantly dissected into four categories:

 Lifecycle challenges include driving usage of a product/service, new client acquisition, enabling cross-sell, up-sell, client retention, activation, usage, preventing churn etc.
 Segment-based challenges Companies have the need to reach out to each customer in a different way suiting their needs, and this is all the more the case when the company has multiple products/product variants. They need to reach out in a focused manner to independent segments that require varying strategies.
 Channel-based challenges Most companies adopt a multi-channel strategy in order to take their products or services to their customers. Each channel — be it a store, online, mobile etc. needs to be tackled differently to ensure maximization of results. The increasing number of touch-points that each customer faces, has led to marketers to grow increasingly reliant on machine-learning and AI models when calculating CVM models. It is also important to balance each channel, to ensure that cannibalization does not occur either.
 Function-based challenges When companies invest in marketing programs, they look for methods that help them evaluate and track how it works and to measure ROI. Systems to manage their programs, maximize results and optimize spends are all that companies keep looking for.

Features 

 Grow value

See also

References 

Customer relationship management
Brand management
Marketing software
Types of marketing
Retail analytics
Strategic management
Professional studies
Financial technology
Banking technology
Sales